Shadow Watch is a 2000 Microsoft Windows video game by Red Storm Entertainment.

Gameplay
It is a turn-based tactics game in which the player fights a conspiracy to halt construction of an international space station. It is based on the Tom Clancy's Power Plays novel Shadow Watch.

The player's team consists of six operatives, each of which has a specialist skill. These abilities can be upgraded and characters learn moves after enough experience points are earned.

Missions are somewhat randomised, and often the story mode will branch out into several paths. Most missions involve killing all of the enemies, but other missions include stealing a package, retrieving a hostage, defending a location. Missions typically have a difficulty and alarm rating, some missions will automatically fail if the alarm is sounded.

In a mission, characters have a certain number of action points (APs). Most actions (shooting weapons, opening doors) cost 1 AP, whereas some moves can consume more. Characters can get injured, and a severe injury will automatically fail the mission.

The music for the game was composed by Bill Brown.

Reception

The game received mixed reviews according to the review aggregation website GameRankings. Christian A. O'Brien of NextGen said in an early review, "Unless you want to trudge through medieval technology and game play, pass right on by Shadow Watch. It belongs in the history books."

References

External links

2000 video games
Red Storm Entertainment games
Single-player video games
Tom Clancy games
Tom Clancy's Power Plays
Turn-based tactics video games
Ubisoft games
Video games developed in the United States
Video games scored by Bill Brown
Video games set in outer space
Windows games
Windows-only games